Quincerot is the name of two communes in France:
 Quincerot, Côte-d'Or
 Quincerot, Yonne